Mayu Island is a strategically located island in Shantou, Guangdong. It is unusual for having two Mazu temples on the same island. The island is located in the estuary of Shantou port, and has an area of 0.97 square kilometers, an elevation of 39 meters, and a coastline of 2.3 km. In the 19th century when Shantou was a treaty port, Mayu was the location of the British and American consulates and a customs house.

Names

The island was originally named Mǎyǔ as it was thought to look like the front of a horse coming out of the water. Nowadays it is called Māyǔ. In imperial times, it was called the "mountain (or island) for letting chickens go" due to the tradition of fishers bringing live chickens to the island's Mazu temple and letting them go. It is also nicknamed "the key to customs" due to its strategic location along an important waterway and its history of hosting customs houses.

In 19th-century English-language sources, it is called "Double Island".

Temples

This temple was destroyed but rebuilt in the year 1861 during the Qing dynasty. It was expanded in 1928, and in 1984 donors from Hong Kong paid for renovations which were completed in 1993.

Another Mazu temple was built on the island during the Qing dynasty; it is said that it was built by a Mr. Wu from Quanzhou who had come to Shantou for business. This second temple was renovated in 1983.

The island also has a Dragon King temple, built in the early Qing dynasty.

History

In the 56th year of the Kangxi Emperor (1717), Mayu Island was placed under the responsibility of Nan'ao's Chenghai Xiezuo Battalion (南澳澄海协左营), but the people who resided there were still under the administration of Chaoyang. In 1853, because Mayu Island was in the channel used by Shantou Port and ocean shipping was flourishing, the Chinese government established a Chinese-operated customs house on the island, known as Xinguan or Changguan.

Under the 1858 Treaty of Tianjin, Shantou was opened as a treaty port, and on the first day of 1860 the United States government established a consulate on Mayu Island. According to British records, a British consulate was opened on 7 July 1860. According to Qing dynasty records, the first British consul on the island was George W. Caine, who arrived in 1860. The British customs house on the island became a symbol of the establishment of the treaty port, and it was designated a protected monument of Shantou in 1994. Residences for foreign customs officials and tax collectors were also built on the island; they were eventually demolished in 1991 and 2002, respectively.

An 1860 American missionary source reported that about twenty foreigners and 2,000 Chinese lived on "Double Island" and that it was known locally as "Má-sù". The same source said that all foreigners in Shantou lived on Mayu, and that the island was the only place where foreigners could live safely.

In modern times

In the PRC era, the island has been used as a defense outpost. After 1949, it was made a restricted military zone, then reopened to the public in 1979, and since then it has become a tourist destination. Near the Dragon King temple is a beach for swimming.

In December 1995, with the construction of the Shantou Bay Bridge, the island became the location of some of the bridge's piers.

In the water near the island's dock is a piece of pumice that locals call the "stone with the mark of the mother", said to be a vestige left by Mazu when she became a spirit and disappeared into the ocean.

References

Shantou
Islands of Guangdong
Diplomatic missions in China
Populated places in China
Islands of China